Zul (also Romanized as Zūl) is a village in Qaen Rural District, in the Central District of Qaen County, South Khorasan Province, Iran. At the 2006 census, its population was 839, in 232 families.

References 

Populated places in Qaen County